South Division may refer to:
 South Division (AFL), a division of the Arena Football League
 South Division (CFL), a former division of the Canadian Football League
 South Division (NAHL), a division of the North American Hockey League
 South Division High School, a school in Milwaukee, Wisconsin, US
 Wendell Phillips Academy High School or South Division High School, a school in Bronzeville, Chicago, Illinois, US

See also

 American Division (NHL), the south division of the National Hockey League in the 1920s–1930s
 Military Division of the South (1869–1876), a U.S. Army during the Reconstruction Period
 South Division One (disambiguation)
 South Division Two (disambiguation)
 Southern Division (disambiguation)